Michael Page (born 1987) is a British professional boxer and mixed martial artist.

Michael Page may also refer to:

People
 Michael Page (activist), co-founder of Celebrate Bisexuality Day
 Michael Page (cricketer) (born 1941), former English cricketer
 Michael Page (equestrian) (born 1938), American equestrian
 Michael Fitzgerald Page (1922–2014), Australian writer and editor
 Mike Page (1940–2021), Major League Baseball outfielder

Other uses
 Michael Page (company), a British recruitment firm